Kaleb Toth (born August 8, 1977) is a Canadian former professional lacrosse player. He played for the Toronto Rock and Calgary Roughnecks of the National Lacrosse League (NLL). He is now an assistant coach for the Vancouver Warriors of the NLL.

Professional career
Toth was the second overall draft pick in the 1999 NLL draft by the Toronto Rock and he played with them for two seasons. A game-winning goal by Toth in the last remaining second of play won the Rock their second straight Champion's Cup with a win over the Rochester Knighthawks in 2000. This goal was the last goal (in any sport) ever scored at Maple Leaf Gardens.

After the 2001 NLL season, Toth was traded to the expansion Calgary Roughnecks for first round draft pick Blaine Manning. A Calgary native, Toth played minor lacrosse with Calgary's Axemen Lacrosse Club. He then went on to play for the Victoria Shamrocks, where he was named both rookie of the year and most sportsmanlike player in 1999. That year he led the Western Lacrosse Association with 52 goals in 17 games and was third overall in scoring with 83 points. He also had a reputation for owning one of the hardest shots in the league, a skill he confirmed by coming in near the top of several 'Hardest Shot' contests at NLL All-Star games.

He retired from the NLL on December 12, 2012. Kaleb played for the Calgary Roughnecks for eleven seasons, making him the longest-tenured member of the franchise to date.

Hockey career
Toth has also played hockey in the Western Hockey League (Prince Albert Raiders, Moose Jaw Warriors & Lethbridge Hurricanes) and ECHL (Baton Rouge Kingfish & Chesapeake Icebreakers).

Statistics

NLL
Reference:

External links

References

1977 births
Calgary Roughnecks players
Canadian ice hockey players
Canadian lacrosse players
Canadian people of Hungarian descent
Sportspeople from Calgary
Lethbridge Hurricanes players
Living people
Moose Jaw Warriors players
National Lacrosse League All-Stars
Prince Albert Raiders players
Toronto Rock players
Ice hockey people from Alberta
Vancouver Warriors coaches